Meitav (lit. Utmost) may refer to:

Meitav, Israel, a moshav in north-eastern Israel
Meitav (military unit), a military unit in the IDF